The Power-House is a novel by John Buchan, a thriller set in London, England. It was written in 1913, when it was serialised in Blackwood's Magazine, and it was published in book form in 1916. The narrator is the barrister and Tory MP Edward Leithen, who features in a number of Buchan's novels. The urban setting contrasts with that of its sequel, John Macnab, which is set in the Scottish Highlands.

The Power-House of the title is an international anarchist organization led by a rich Englishman named Andrew Lumley. Its plan to destroy Western civilisation is thwarted by Leithen with the assistance of a burly Labour MP.

"The dominant theme of Buchan's fiction is the fragility of civilisation," it has been said in the context of a discussion of The Power-House. What the critic Christopher Harvie calls "perhaps the most famous line in all Buchan" occurs during the first meeting between Leithen and Lumley, when the latter tells the former, "You think that a wall as solid as the earth separates civilisation from barbarism. I tell you the division is a thread, a sheet of glass" (Chapter 3). Harvie cites a comparable passage from the second volume of The Golden Bough, where Frazer speaks of "a solid layer of savagery beneath the surface of society," which, "unaffected by the superficial changes of religion and culture," is "a standing menace to civilisation. We seem to move on a thin crust which may at any time be rent by the subterranean forces slumbering beneath." Similar sentiments were expressed by other writers of the period, including Nietzsche, Freud and Conrad.

Talking to Lumley, Leithen is reminded of an encounter he once had in Tyrol with a "Nietzschean" German professor who told him, "Someday there will come the marriage of knowledge and will, and then the world will march." This quote has been described as prophetic of Nazism.

The "nameless brains" who form the Power-House, Lumley reveals, are "great extra-social intelligences" who have opted out of the "conspiracy" called civilisation. "They may be idealists and desire to make a new world, or they may simply be artists, loving for its own sake the pursuit of truth." It takes "both types to bring about results, for the second find the knowledge and the first the will to use it" (Chapter 3). The Power-House is "highly-scientific" (Chapter 5) and among its members are "artists in discovery who will never use their knowledge until they can use it with full effect" (Chapter 3). When Charles Pitt-Heron, the friend of Leithen whose flight abroad is the starting-point of the novel, joins the Power-House, he turns his billiard-room into a laboratory, "where he works away half the night" (Chapter 1). The Russian anarchist theoretician Peter Kropotkin, who was also a biologist and zoologist, wrote in his pamphlet Modern Science and Anarchism (1901): "Anarchism is a world-concept based on a mechanical explanation of all phenomena....Its method of investigation is that of the exact natural sciences."

During their final meeting, Leithen accuses Lumley of believing "nothing", but Lumley dissents from this judgement. "'I am a sceptic about most things,' he said, 'but, believe me, I have my own worship. I venerate the intellect of man. I believe in its undreamed-of possibilities, when it grows free like an oak in the forest and is not dwarfed in a flower-pot. From that allegiance I have never wavered. That is the God I have never foresworn.'" (Chapter 8)

References

External links
 
 E-text of The Power House at Gaslight
 

1916 British novels
Novels by John Buchan
Novels first published in serial form
Scottish novels
Works originally published in Blackwood's Magazine